Mareike Adams (born 27 February 1990) is a German rower. She competed in the 2015 World Rowing Championships winning a bronze medal. At the 2016 Summer Olympics in Rio de Janeiro, she competed in the women's double sculls with teammate Marie-Cathérine Arnold. They finished in 7th place.

References

External links
 
 
 

1990 births
Living people
German female rowers
People from Wetzlar
Sportspeople from Giessen (region)
World Rowing Championships medalists for Germany
Rowers at the 2016 Summer Olympics
Olympic rowers of Germany